The Hexham Bridge is a pair of road bridges that carry the Pacific Highway across the Hunter River from Tarro to Tomago in the Hunter Region of New South Wales, Australia. It comprises two separate structures; a steel truss bridge opened on the 17 December 1952 by Acting Minister of Transport George Weir and a concrete bridge opened in 1987.

History
Prior to the construction of the bridge, the Department of Main Roads operated a car ferry to carry the Pacific Highway across the Hunter River. In November 1945, a contract was awarded to build a steel truss bridge with a central lifting span. However, due to a shortage of materials following World War II, it was not completed until December 1952.

A concrete high-level fixed bridge opened to the west of the original bridge in July 1987 to carry northbound traffic, with the original converted to carry southbound traffic only.

References

External links

Bridges completed in 1952
Concrete bridges in Australia
Hunter River (New South Wales)
Road bridges in New South Wales
Steel bridges in Australia
Vertical lift bridges in Australia
1952 establishments in Australia